Barringer–Overbaugh–Lasher House is a historic home located at Germantown, Columbia County, New York.  The original section was built about 1800, and expanded about 1865.  It is a small -story, "L"-shaped vernacular frame dwelling with a lean-to addition.  The front facade features a Late Victorian period porch.

It was added to the National Register of Historic Places in 2014.

References 

Houses on the National Register of Historic Places in New York (state)
Victorian architecture in New York (state)
Houses completed in 1800
Houses in Columbia County, New York
National Register of Historic Places in Columbia County, New York